Montgomery County Airport may refer to:

 Montgomery County Airport (North Carolina) in Montgomery County, North Carolina, United States
 Montgomery County Airpark in Montgomery County, Maryland, United States
 Mount Sterling-Montgomery County Airport in Montgomery County, Kentucky, United States
 Winona-Montgomery County Airport in Montgomery County, Mississippi, United States

Airports in places named Montgomery County:
 Lone Star Executive Airport in Montgomery County, Texas, United States